Cheshmeh Kanan (also Romanized as Cheshmeh Kanān, Chashmeh Konān, and Cheshmeh Konān; also known as Chashmeh Khuni, Chechmakyuna,  and Cheshmeh Khūni) is a village in Chehregan Rural District, Tasuj District, Shabestar County, East Azerbaijan Province, Iran. At the 2006 census, its population was 387, in 137 families.

References 

Populated places in Shabestar County